Wahl may refer to:

Wahl (surname)
Wahl, Luxembourg, commune and small town  in the canton of Redange, Luxembourg
Wahl, Alabama, unincorporated community, United States
Wahl Clipper Corporation

See also

Wal (disambiguation)
Waal (disambiguation)
WHAL (disambiguation)
Wall (disambiguation)